Hochstrasser is a surname. Notable people with the surname include:

Alfred Hochstrasser, American composer and record producer
Erwin Hochsträsser, Swiss footballer
Robin M. Hochstrasser (1931–2013), Scottish-born American chemist
Xavier Hochstrasser (born 1988), Swiss footballer

German-language surnames